Queen Elizabeth Hospital in King's Lynn, Norfolk, England. It is located on the outskirts of King's Lynn, to the eastern edge of the town. The catchment area of the Queen Elizabeth Hospital covers the West Norfolk area, South Lincolnshire and Northern part of Fenland District, Cambridgeshire, an area of approximately 1500 km2 and 250,000 people. It is managed by the Queen Elizabeth Hospital King's Lynn NHS Foundation Trust. The Queen Elizabeth Hospital is named after Queen Elizabeth The Queen Mother, rather than Queen Elizabeth II.

History 
The hospital, was built as a two-storey building, with a Reinforced Autoclaved Aerated Concrete (RAAC) plank roof. The Fermoy Unit, which provides mental health services, opened in 1980. In February 1998 the Queen Mother was taken to the hospital after she fractured her hip at nearby Sandringham, before being transferred to King Edward VII's Hospital in London. The Arthur Levin Day Surgery Centre was opened by Queen Elizabeth II on 11 January 1999. Also in January 1999, the Queen Mother was again taken to the hospital after a series of nosebleeds, where they cauterised her nose.

During her Golden Jubilee in 2002, the Queen who usually spent accession day in private at Windsor Castle, opened the hospital's £1.2 million Macmillan Cancer Unit. The Queen was taken to the hospital in January 2003 after she had problems with her knee, where they performed a scan, and she was transferred to King Edward VII's Hospital in London for an operation to remove torn cartilage.

Various other members of the Royal Family have visited the hospital over the years, including Princess Anne who opened the £5 million Critical Care Unit in 2005. The Roxburgh Children's Day Centre, which provides outpatient care for children and a comprehensive sexual health clinic, opened in summer 2008. On 1 February 2011, the hospital was awarded Foundation Trust status.

The hospital was originally designed for a life of 25 years. In March 2021, after 40 years of life, the RAAC plank roof was said to be structurally unsafe and hundreds of support props had to be installed. The foundation trust started lobbying for funding to replace the hospital with a new building. Shortly afterwards it had to evacuate and then close the critical care unit while new roof supports were installed.

Services 
The hospital site contains the main hospital building as well as the Fermoy Unit and the Arthur Levin Day Surgery Centre which are both joined to the main hospital building by a long service corridor. The hospital has a full accident and emergency department. The hospital has MRI and CT scanners on site for imaging and diagnosis. There are 7 operating theatres and 19 inpatient wards. The wards are all named after local villages and towns. In March 2022 the hospital had over 500 beds and the trust has around 4,000 staff and volunteers. The hospital works in partnership with Norwich Medical School, the School of Nursing and Midwifery at the University of East Anglia and the School of Clinical Medicine of the University of Cambridge.

Performance 

The Care Quality Commission formerly the Healthcare Commission reviews hospitals annually and rates a hospital on two points: “Use of Resources” (which is based on finances) and “Quality of Service” (which is based on clinical performance). These two points are rated on a scale of “weak”, “Fair”, “Good” and “Excellent”. In the 2007/08 Healthcare Commission's review, it rated the Queen Elizabeth Hospital's “Use of Resources” as “Weak” and “Quality of Service” as “Good”. The “weak” rating for use of resources was due primarily to the hospital's debts, now all cleared. The “good” rating for quality of service is indicative of its clinical performance and waiting times. The Queen Elizabeth Hospital had good patient satisfaction rates, is nationally acknowledged for its infection control excellence and arrangements for keeping patients safe. The Critical Care Centre has consistently been rated amongst the best in the country by external ICNARC review (ICNARC Casemix Programme).

The hospital has an international reputation for the research into prevention of ventilator-associated pneumonia. The Accident and Emergency department in the hospital in 2014-15 performed at 90.8% against the four-hour target. The Arthur Levin Day Surgery Centre is consistently ranked amongst the top in the country. MRSA rates are now also amongst the best in the country, with the biggest reduction. Research by a consultant at the QEH, Professor Lynn Liebowitz, led to a dramatic reduction in MRSA cases, and is now assisting the Department of Health to reduce MRSA in other hospitals. In March 2014 it marked two years MRSA free.

in October 2013 the trust was warned after consistently failing to meet the national standards of quality and safety by the Care Quality Commission and put in the highest risk category. It was placed in special measures by Monitor.  A contingency planning team was sent to the hospital in March 2014 tasked with making recommendations to the foundation trust regulator about options for ensuring sustainable patient services at the trust.

It was removed from special measures in August 2015 after an inspection found “marked improvement in the quality of care being delivered”.

In 2014/5 the trust was given a loan of £16.8 million by the Department of Health which is supposed to be paid back in five years.

It was rated as having the lowest index of digital maturity of any NHS hospital trust in England in April 2016.

In 2018 it was put back in special measures, with particular concerns around maternity services.  Vacancy rates of over 40% on a number of wards forced the trust to consider widespread cancellation of routine surgery.  In July 2019 the Care Quality Commission extended the special measures after inspectors said they found an “extremely concerning” lack of improvement, with "significant concerns and risks to patients within the urgent and emergency service, medicine, end of life care and gynaecology".

It was announced in February 2022 that the hospital was out of special measures and considered by the Care Quality Commission to be "caring, effective and well led".

Finances 
The hospital trust successfully applied for Foundation Status in 2010. The trust predicted a deficit of £14m in 2013–14.

Trust Charitable Fund

Many patients and their families make donations to the hospital. These donations are treated separately to the main hospital income as they go to The Queen Elizabeth Hospital, King's Lynn, NHS Trust Charitable Fund. The registered charity number is 1051327.

League of Friends 
The League of Friends of the King's Lynn Area Hospitals was registered as a charity (Registered charity no 207408) in 1953. Since then the band of volunteers, who staff the hospital shop and carry out other fundraising activities, have raised millions of pounds which has been spent on essential equipment for the hospital.

Fiction 
Birthplace of Alan Partridge.

See also
 List of NHS trusts

References

External links 
 

NHS hospitals in England
Hospitals in Norfolk
King's Lynn
Hospitals established in 1980
NHS foundation trusts